Rimanella is a monotypic genus of damselflies, the only genus in the family Rimanellidae. It contains the single species Rimanella arcana. This damselfly is known commonly as the Pantepui Relict Damsel. It is native to South America, where it occurs in Guyana, Venezuela, and Suriname.

This is a common species which inhabits mountain stream habitat above 800 meters in elevation.

References

Calopterygoidea
Monotypic Odonata genera
Zygoptera genera
Odonata of South America
Taxonomy articles created by Polbot